Avrelian is an old and uncommon Russian male first name. The name is derived from either Latin Aurelius (a Roman gens), itself derived from the Latin word aureolus, meaning golden, or from the adjective Aurelianus.

The name was included into various, often handwritten, church calendars throughout the 17th–19th centuries, but was omitted from the official Synodal Menologium at the end of the 19th century. In 1924–1930, the name was included into various Soviet calendars, which included the new and often artificially created names, although in this case the name was simply re-introduced.

Its diminutives include Avrelya, Relya, and Ava.

The patronymics derived from "Avrelian" are "" (Avrelianovich; masculine) and "" (Avrelianovna; feminine).

References

Notes

Sources
Н. А. Петровский (N. A. Petrovsky). "Словарь русских личных имён" (Dictionary of Russian First Names). ООО Издательство "АСТ". Москва, 2005. 
[1] А. В. Суперанская (A. V. Superanskaya). "Современный словарь личных имён: Сравнение. Происхождение. Написание" (Modern Dictionary of First Names: Comparison. Origins. Spelling). Айрис-пресс. Москва, 2005. 
[2] А. В. Суперанская (A. V. Superanskaya). "Словарь русских имён" (Dictionary of Russian Names). Издательство Эксмо. Москва, 2005. 

